Holly Ridge may refer to:

Holly Ridge, Mississippi
Holly Ridge, North Carolina

See also
Hollyridge Strings